Robert de La Berge (1638–1712) was one of the original colonists to settle in New France in 1658, and became one of the early industrialists in the area.

Early life and journey to America
Robert de La Berge was born on May 24, 1638, in Colomby-sur-Thaon, Normandy, France, in what is now the department of Calvados. Robert was the son of Jacques de la Berge and Marie Poitevin who were married on May 8, 1636 in Colomby-sur-Thaon. Marie Poitevin was the widow of Jacques Touchet and had a son, Thomas, from that marriage. Jacques and Marie had two other sons: Abraham (born 2 September 1640) and Guillaume (born 15 February 1643). Abraham and Guillaume remained in France.

Thomas Touchet, a carpenter by trade, had spent the years from 1650 to 1653 in New France. When he returned to New France in 1658, he took his half-brother Robert with him. Robert went to New France as a laborer, under a 3-year contract to work for a man named Massé Gravel in Château-Richer. Under the terms of the contract, Robert received a cash advance, an annual salary, and a guaranteed return trip to France. Robert arrived in New France aboard the ship Taureau on August 6, 1658.

In 1661, Robert completed his 3-year obligation to Massé Gravel, but instead of returning to France, he received a concession of land in Château-Richer. In the October 1662, after a year of hard work, Robert sold the land to Charles Pouliot. Robert was apparently discouraged and intended to return to France. During the winter, Robert must have changed his mind. On February 4, 1663 Robert received a concession of land in the parish of Sainte-Famille.

At about this same time, Nicolas Durand and his wife Françoise Gausse dit Le Borgne were living on a farm in Château-Richer (which would later become L'Ange-Gardien) with their infant daughter, Marie-Ursule.  Nicolas had received the land as a concession from Olivier Le Tardif and built a wood house with a stone chimney on it.  While that wood house, along with an addition built in 1697, was burned by the English in 1759, it is believed the two surviving stone chimneys are those of Maison Laberge.  Françoise Gausse was the daughter of Maurice Gausse and Marguerite Blay of Noyon, Picardy, France. In late March 1663, Nicolas Durand had a fatal accident while clearing his fields. His widow and young daughter were left to fend for themselves.

After only two months of widowhood, Françoise married Robert LaBerge on May 28, 1663 in Château-Richer. Françoise probably knew Robert from his earlier years in Château-Richer. Robert sold his property in Sainte-Famille and took up residence on the Durand farm in Château-Richer.

In the years that followed, Robert became a respected citizen. He participated in the election of the first 3 church wardens of L'Ange-Gardien. Records of his business transactions indicate that Robert prospered financially in New France. Robert was one of the early industrialists in the area. Sometime before 1674, Robert installed furnaces which were used for the manufacturing of lime. In 1674 Maison Laberge was built. It was later expanded in 1692 and 1791. It is one of the oldest buildings in Canada. Maison Laberge is located at 14, rue Adrien Laberge, L'Ange-Gardien, Quebec, QC  G0A 2K0.

The LaBerge household also grew over the years. Robert and Françoise had six children: 
Geneviève LaBerge was born on 22 April 1664 and was baptized the following day.
Françoise LaBerge died a few days after her birth and was buried in Château-Richer on 6 February 1666.
Catherine LaBerge was baptized on 15 September 1667.  In 1687 she married Guillaume Maroist.  In 1702 he purchased the western portion of the Laberge property from Nicolas who had received it as his inheritance.  The 30th prime minister of Québec, Mme Pauline Marois, is a direct descendant of Guillaume Maroist.
François LaBerge was born on 12 June 1669.
Nicolas LaBerge was baptized on 29 February 1672.  In 1702, Nicolas sold his property mentioned above, left his wife and children and went to help establish a tannery at present day Cairo, Illinois.  After an epidemic broke out, he continued down the Mississippi to Mobile where he arrived in 1705.  He was in the 1711 census and one of the very earliest inhabitants of French Louisiana.
Guillaume LaBerge was born on 30 April 1674.  In 1702, Guillaume had signed a contract to farm at Fort Pontchartrain du Detroit but did not leave most likely because of the lawsuit with Marie Ursule Durand mentioned below was resolved.

Robert was involved in a near-fatal accident during a trip to Québec. The event which took place prior to 1667 was recorded by Father Thomas Morel as follows:

Later life and death 

LaBerge became embroiled in a legal dispute with his stepdaughter, Marie-Ursule Durande, that lasted for 5 years before finally being resolved. On March 22, 1694 Robert obtained a receipt for 600 pounds from Marie-Ursule and her husband, Antoine Huppé dit Lagrois. This receipt was in return for the 600 pounds stipulated in her marriage contract and granted the entire property in L'Ange-Gardien to Robert. Later, in 1697, Robert sold a half acre to his son Guillaume. In 1697, Robert sold most of the remaining property to his sons, Nicolas and Guillaume. It was after these transactions, in 1698, that Marie-Ursule and her husband filed a petition with Sovereign Council seeking to have their marriage contract declared null and void and to renounce their inheritances. Marie-Ursule alleged that she was short-changed on her inheritance by Robert and Françoise who underestimated the value of her father's estate. She also alleged that she was a victim of her stepfather's greed and that he had attempted to marry her off at the age of 12 to a simpleton. She stated that her marriage to Antoine Huppé freed her from the slavery and abuses of her stepfather, Robert. The Court initially decided in favor of Marie-Ursule. Robert and Françoise appealed and the decision was overturned in August 1703 and all of Marie-Ursule's claims were dismissed.

Robert LaBerge lived to the age of 74. His son, François, took care of him during his last years. Robert was found dead in his bed on the morning of 12 April 1712. He died at the home of Guillaume Boucher, the father-in-law of his son, François. Robert was buried in Château-Richer on the same day.

Françoise Gausse died at the home of her daughter, Marie-Ursule Durant, in Beauport. She was buried on 8 March 1714. The burial records gave her age as 80 years.

De La Berge surname and notable descendants 
He was the first to arrive in North America with his surname. Most people today with his surname (and its variants) in North America trace their family roots back to him. His descendants have held esteemed positions in private industry, Church and State in both Canada and the United States and include notable patriots, writers, artists, humanitarians, explorers and adventurers.  While there are currently many Laberges in the town of L'Ange-Gardien where Maison Laberge is located, many Laberges migrated to Montreal and the town of Châteauguay, just south of it.

When Robert arrived in 1658 he was illiterate but soon learned to read and write, most likely from Françoise.  Robert signed his name many different ways.  During the period of 1660 to 1680 one finds his named signed as: Robert de la Barge (1660); Rober de laberge (1662); Robert de Laberge (1663); Robert De la berge (1663); Rober La Berge (1663); Robert de la Bergue (1663); Robert Labarge (1665); Rober de la berge (1667); Rober la Berge (1668); Robert Laberge (1671); Robert laberge (1674),and Robert de laberge (1678).

Starting in 1680 the form which prevailed and was widely used was Robert Laberge. As his children and descendants migrated into different parts of Canada and the United States, the name took two spellings:  La Berge and La Barge with combinations of space or no space and capital "B" or lower case "b."  As an example, see the surname spellings of the Notable Descendants listed below. The predominant spelling used today in Québec is Laberge.

The meaning in modern French of "la Berge" is "a bank or edge of a river or canal."  Prior to about 1590, however, there is no trace of the name "de la Berge."  The stem "Berg" with its early Germanic, Dutch & Nordic origins means "mountain" and is very common throughout Europe with many variants.

Captain Joseph LaBarge (1815–1899) - Joseph LaBarge of St. Louis, Missouri, was one of the most famous of the Mississippi river boat captains. He transported people and goods up and down the Mississippi and Missouri rivers. According to an 1898 newspaper article, Captain LaBarge was the man who taught Mark Twain about the Mississippi River. His illustrious life is documented in the book, History of Early Steamboat Navigation on the Missouri River: Life and Adventures of Joseph LaBarge by Hiram M. Chittenden. 
Joseph LaBarge Biography

Joseph Marie LaBerge (1787–1860) - The father of famed riverboat captain, Joseph LaBarge, Joseph Marie LaBarge Sr. was born at l'Assomption, Quebec, on July 4, 1787. In about 1808, he emigrated to St. Louis in a birch-bark canoe, travelling through various waterways to reach the Mississippi River. LaBarge served in the War of 1812 and was wounded in the battle of the River Raisin. In this battle, LaBarge lost two fingers from a gunshot and was scarred for life from a tomahawk wound to the head. He became a naturalized citizen following his service in the Army. For several years he was involved in the manufacture of charcoal and later owned a hotel and livery in St. Louis. He is probably best known for his exploits as a fur trapper in the far west. Several geographical landmarks such as LaBarge (or Battle) Creek and the city of La Barge, Wyoming, were named in his honor. These took their name from a battle with Indians in which LaBarge took part. Details of this event have been lost, however. LaBarge was also present in General Ashley's disastrous fight with the Aricara Indians on the Missouri River in 1823, and was the man who cut the cable of one of the keelboats so that it might drift out of range of the fire of the Indians. In January 1860, while on his way to visit an ill relative, LaBarge slipped on an icy St. Louis sidewalk and struck the curb. He died from his injuries two days later on January 22, 1860. (Further details of Joseph Marie LaBarge's life are contained in Hiram Martin Chittenden's book, History of Early Steamboat Navigation on the Missouri River: Life and Adventures of Joseph LaBarge, published by Ross & Haines, 1962.)

Michel LaBerge (1836–1909) - Michel Laberge, born in Chateauguay, Quebec, was the first French-Canadian to explore the Yukon in 1866. Laberge worked at one time for the Russians and in 1867 he did some surveying for Western Union who wanted to build an overland telegraph to Europe. He later engaged in the fur trade in the Yukon under the name of the Pioneer American Fur Company. His contribution to geography is commemorated by Lake Laberge in the Yukon Territory, which was named after him in 1870. The lake, also known as Lake Lebarge in some early documentation, was the setting for Robert W. Service's famous poem, The Cremation of Sam McGee.

Jean Baptiste LaBerge (1804–1883) - Leader of Rebellion of 1838, also called Lower Canada Rebellion in Beauharnois, Quebec. For his part in the uprising, Jean-Baptiste Laberge was imprisoned in Montreal on November 16, 1838 and received the death sentence on January 26, 1839. The sentence was changed to deportation and he was exiled to Australia, arriving in February 1840. Laberge and his fellow prisoners were later pardoned and Laberge was back with his family by the spring of 1844 and was regarded as a hero in his local community.

Mia LaBerge (born 1967) is an American artist who painted the first Steinway Art Case Piano created to honor a university.   In 2006, LaBerge was commissioned to paint the Madison Bluestone Art Case Piano which celebrates the hundredth anniversary of James Madison University and also recognizes its status as Virginia’s first All-Steinway Music School. The Madison Bluestone was among the last Art Case pianos with which Henry Z. Steinway (1915-2008), the National Medal of Arts winner and last of the long line of Steinway family members to be president of Steinway & Sons, had direct involvement.   The piano was exhibited in the rotunda of New York City's Steinway Hall and was ceremonially unveiled on stage at the Kennedy Center in Washington,DC.   Steinway kept LaBerge unofficially "on call" to paint scenic music stands for the company's Madison Century series of limited-edition pianos. Circa 1990-2005, LaBerge's oil paintings were primarily realistic or painterly-realistic. Her art work from 2006 and later became ever more abstract—finally moving toward nonobjective subject matter. LaBerge had minor gallery representation in Philadelphia and elsewhere, but from 2003 to 2008 she preferred to interact directly with prospective patrons by self-exhibiting at juried art festivals in the parks and streets of Chicago, Tampa, Madison, Norfolk, Philadelphia, and Richmond. Artist Terry Ward served as LaBerge's roadie and occasional studio assistant at the time. In 2009 she ceased traveling for maternity leave. A distant descendant of the LaBerges after whom Lake Laberge was named, Minneapolis-born Laberge is an alumna of Virginia Commonwealth University and of James Madison University. She supplemented college studies in art with museum-study  trips to The Louvre in Paris,  "the Met" in New York, and with frequent trips the National Gallery of Art. Her paintings have appeared in the coffee table book Virginia's Cattle Story : The First 400 Years and on the cover of youth textbook All About You : A Course in Character for Teens .   At least one LaBerge painting is in the collection of former US President Jimmy Carter.

Dr. Walter LaBerge - (1924–2004). Born in Chicago, Illinois, Dr. Walter B. LaBerge had a distinguished career in the field of aerospace engineering which encompasses over 20 years in private industry and over 20 years in service to the U.S. Government. During World War II, he was "skipper" of YMS 165 in the Pacific and served as Technical Director of the Naval Ordnance Test Station in China Lake, California. Dr. LaBerge was appointed to the positions of Assistant Secretary of the Air Force, Assistant Secretary General of NATO, and Under Secretary of the Army. In private industry, he was a Corporate Vice-President for Lockheed Corporation and Vice-President of Philco-Ford. During his career, Dr. LaBerge led an industrial team which designed and built the NASA Mission Control Center in Houston and was a principal participant on a government team which designed the Sidewinder missile. Dr. LaBerge was a member of the National Academy of Engineering and was a former chairman and member of the Army Science Board. He served as an adjunct professor at the University of Texas at Austin. Dr. LaBerge died on July 16, 2004. See Dr. Walter LaBerge bio.  Walter's son Philip is the current owner of Maison Laberge.

Margaret Wade Labarge (1916–2009) was a Canadian historian and author specializing in the role of women in the Middle Ages. She was the adjunct professor of history at Carleton University.

Bernie LaBarge (born Ottawa, Ontario on March 11, 1953) - Bernie started playing guitar at age 11 (1964) and began playing professionally in 1967. He was the frontman and/or guitarist for many popular bands in Ontario and nominated for Most Promising Male Vocalist at 1984 Juno Awards for his album entitled "Barging In" (Sony). Bernie has also been a sideman on over 100 albums and has toured or recorded with The Irish Rovers, Kim Mitchell, Frank Byner of Tower of Power, Long John Baldry, Doug Riley, Cassandra Vasik, Joel Feeney. He has composed and performed on many North American and worldwide commercial jingles. Bernie won the Canadian Songwriting Contest in 1986 (Best R&B Song category) and many top Canadian and International performers have covered his songs. Currently Toronto-based, Bernie is the lead guitarist for The Dexters, David Clayton-Thomas, and Danny B and the R&B All-Stars.

Stanislaus Napoleon LaBerge was the first white child born in Union County, South Dakota. He was born to Joseph and Ms. LaBerge, March 17, 1861, in a covered wagon near Elk Point, South Dakota while on their way to locate a claim a mile west of Elk Point, South Dakota—later known as the Compton farm.

LaBarge, Inc. is an electronics company based in St. Louis, Missouri. Craig LaBarge is the CEO and Chairman.

David LaBerge was born in 1929 in St. Louis, Missouri. He received his undergraduate degree from the College of Wooster, and his MA and PhD degrees from Claremont University and Stanford University, respectively. Dr. LaBerge formerly taught at Indiana University, Bloomington, University of Minnesota, and University of California at Irvine from 1955 until 1997. He was also a member of the adjunct faculty in psychology and biology at Simon's Rock College of Bard from 1997-2007. He is now a visiting scholar at the University of Washington, Seattle. Specializing in the attention process, he has conducted experiments using response-time methods of cognitive psychology and brain imagining methods of neurobiology.

Arthur LaBerge was a member of the Legislative Assembly of Quebec from 1956 to 1960. He served as a representative of Châteauguay for the Union Nationale. The 25th Legislative Assembly of Quebec was the Quebec, Canada provincial political legislature that existed from June 20, 1956 and June 22, 1960. The Union Nationale was the governing party for the fourth consecutive mandate. He served under Maurice Duplessis last term as Premier of Quebec.

Stephen LaBerge (born 1947) is a psychophysiologist and a leader in the scientific study of lucid dreaming. In 1967 he received his bachelor's degree in mathematics. He began researching lucid dreaming for his Ph.D. in psychophysiology at Stanford University, which he received in 1980. He developed techniques to enable himself and other researchers to enter a lucid dream state at will, most notably the MILD technique (mnemonic induction of lucid dreams), which was necessary for many forms of dream experimentation.  In 1987, he founded The Lucidity Institute, an organization that promotes research into lucid dreaming, as well as running courses for the general public on how to achieve a lucid dream. His technique of signalling to a collaborator monitoring his EEG with agreed-upon eye movements during REM became the first published, scientifically-verified signal from a dreamer's mind to the outside world. The first confirmed signal came from Alan Worsley under study in England;  however his group did not publish their results until later. Though the technique is simple, it opens broad new avenues of dream research and pushed the field of dream research, or oneirology, beyond its protoscientific and largely discredited psychoanalytic roots, establishing it as a fruitful and respectable discipline.

Édouard Laberge (August 21, 1829 – August 22, 1883) was a physician and political figure in Quebec. He represented Châteauguay in the Legislative Assembly of Quebec from 1867 to 1882 as a Liberal. He was born in Sainte-Philomène, Lower Canada, the son of François Laberge and Appoline Brault. Laberge was educated at the collège de Montréal and McGill University. He qualified to practise as a doctor in 1856 and set up practice at Sainte-Philomène. In 1862, he married Nathalie Poulin. Laberge died in office at Sainte-Philomène at the age of 54.

Louis Laberge, PQ (February 18, 1924 – July 19, 2002) was a French Canadian labour union leader. He was president of the Fédération des travailleurs du Québec (Quebec Federation of Labour). In 1988, he was made an Officer of the National Order of Quebec. A state funeral was held at Montreal's Mary, Queen of the World Cathedral.

Brian Laberge, CPA, CA (Born Montreal, Quebec, 1967) is a senior audit partner at BDO Canada LLP.

Pascal Laberge (Born Sainte-Martine, Quebec, April 9, 1998) is a Canadian ice hockey player who was the 36th overall pick by the Philadelphia Flyers in the 2016 NHL Draft.

Joseph W. La Barge (born 1971, Danville, Pennsylvania) is an American biotechnology executive and life-sciences advisor. He currently serves as Chief Executive Officer and a member of the Board of Managers of Apertura Gene Therapy  a genomic medicine startup with $67 million in funding. La Barge is known for his involvement with the growth and sale of Spark Therapeutics, a Philadelphia based biotechnology company developing novel gene therapies for a suite of rare diseases. Spark Therapeutics was sold for $4.8 billion in 2019 to Roche, a global pharmaceutical and diagnostics company.

Samuel Laberge (Born in Châteauguay, Canada) is a Canadian ice hockey currently playing in the AHL for the Utica Comets within the New Jersey Devils organization.

References 

Jetté, René. Dictionnaire généaloguque des familles du Québec. Montréal: Les Presses de l’Université de Montréal, 1983, page 620.
LaBerge, Lionel. Robert de la Berge. L'Ange Gardien, Quebec: [Original source of this article is unknown], 1963.
Laforest, Thomas J. Our French-Canadian Ancestors, Volume XV. Palm Harbor, Florida: The Lisi Press, 1992, pages 145-156. [This text is available directly from the publisher: Lisi Press, P.O. Box 1063, Palm Harbor, Florida 34682-1063.]
Sorensen, Lola. LaBarge Genealogy. Manuscript prepared for Pierre L. LaBarge and donated to Mormon Family History Library, Salt Lake City (Call Number: US/CAN, Book Area, 929.273, L111s), 1985.
Tanguay, Cyprien. Dictionnaire généaloguque des familles canadiennes Vol. 5. Montréal: Esuèbe Senécal & Fils, 1871 (reprinted 1975), p. 51.
Union County website at: http://unioncountysd.com/

External links 
LaBarge/LaBerge website
Laberge Info web site
Colomby-sur-Thaon web site
Wikipedia definition of Berge
Berg Surnames

1638 births
1712 deaths
People from Colomby-Anguerny
People of New France